Commander Samuel "Sam" Axe, USN (ret.) is a fictional character in the television series Burn Notice and TV movie Burn Notice: The Fall of Sam Axe, and is played by Bruce Campbell. He is the best friend of "burned" ex-spy Michael Westen, the main character in Burn Notice.

Overview 
Sam served over 20 years as a U.S. Navy SEAL and "retired" with full benefits at the rank of Commander in February 2005, as part of a graymail deal which kept the true events of potentially embarrassing Operation PROVIDE SUPPORT in Colombia a secret. The deal included a first-class air ticket to Miami, a change of clothing, and an ice-cold beer.  In Miami, Axe helps Michael Westen with freelance work, having known him since at least 1992, and a job they did together in Poland. Sam's value to Westen often involves his seemingly infinite list of contacts. With a low amount of cash to his name, Sam has a string of "sugar mommas" with whom he connects in exchange for shelter and spending money.

Sam frequently uses the cover name "Chuck Finley" after the California Angels pitcher, whom he frequently and successfully wagered upon; coincidentally it is also the name of a coworker of Bruce Campbell's father, who also was, according to The Press Democrat, once friends with the real-life baseball player.

Sam Axe as Chuck Finley 
"Chuck Finley" is an alias and cover identity Sam Axe uses in many episodes of Burn Notice. "Chuck Finley" also turns into "Charles Finley" when Sam feels that his cover needs to be more sophisticated and up-scale, and is often a con-artist as well as a "legit" persona.

Overview of Chuck Finley 
Chuck Finley made the first appearance in the third episode of the first season of Burn Notice, "Fight or Flight" as the attorney of character Cara Stagner, a waitress at the nightclub below Michael's loft.

However, chronologically as per the series, Chuck Finley appears first in the prequel The Fall of Sam Axe. Axe adopts the Chuck Finley alias for the first time at a "secret CIA intelligence facility" in Colombia while calling for help from a military base in Santa Marta; in this case, the alias is "Deputy Assistant Intelligence Director Chuck Finley" from the NSA headquarters.

When Axe is asked by aid worker Amanda Maples why he chose the name "Chuck Finley", Sam replies: "Made a lot of money betting on him back in the day. I'm thinking it's a lucky name," while Sam holds up an undated edition of a fictitious magazine called Sports Action, with the cover reading displaying the baseball pitcher Chuck Finley.

Chuck Finley: The Character 
In an interview, Bruce Campbell has stated that Sam Axe uses Chuck Finley to convince people without dragging the Sam Axe character, who has a past career as a U.S. Navy SEAL, into the matter.

Bruce Campbell has mentioned that, coincidentally, it is also the name of a former co-worker of his real-life father.

In an interview about Burn Notice: The Fall of Sam Axe to Darryl Morden of Buzzine, Bruce Campbell has mentioned the following:

Morden: "What about Sam's con-artist persona Chuck Finley? Will we see more of him on the show or in the prequel movie?"
Campbell: "Oh yeah, Chuck is all over the place. Chuck Finley is forever." [And Chuck was also on giveaway Burn Notice t-shirts handed out to fans attending the panel.]

Appearances of Chuck Finley in episodes of Burn Notice 
Chuck Finley has made appearances in numerous episodes throughout the entire run of Burn Notice:

In all the episodes, Chuck has taken different professions which suited the situation, ranging from a lawyer or police officer or doctor, to motivational speaker or Glades homeowners association member.

References

External links 
 USA Burn Notice: Sam Axe Character Bio at USA.com

Burn Notice characters
Fictional characters from California
Fictional United States Navy SEALs personnel
Television characters introduced in 2007